"Romeo and Juliet" is a rock song by the British rock band Dire Straits, written by frontman Mark Knopfler. It first appeared on the 1980 album Making Movies and was released as a single in 1981. The song subsequently appeared on the Dire Straits live albums Alchemy and On the Night, and later on Knopfler's live duet album with Emmylou Harris, Real Live Roadrunning (though Harris does not perform on the track).  The track was also featured on the greatest hits albums Money for Nothing, Sultans of Swing: The Very Best of Dire Straits, and The Best of Dire Straits & Mark Knopfler: Private Investigations.

Composition and lyrical interpretation
The lyrics of the song describe the experience of the two lovers of the title, hinting at a situation that saw the "Juliet" figure abandon her "Romeo" after finding fame and moving on from the rough neighborhood where they first encountered each other. In addition to the reference to William Shakespeare's play of the same title, the song makes playful allusion to other works involving young love, including the songs "Somewhere" – from West Side Story, which is itself based on the Shakespeare play – and "My Boyfriend's Back".

The song opens on an arpeggiated resonator guitar part played by Knopfler, who also sings the lead vocal. The introductory arpeggios and melody are played on a National Style "O" guitar, the same guitar featured on the album artwork for Brothers in Arms and Sultans of Swing: The Very Best of Dire Straits. In the Sky Arts documentary Guitar Stories: Mark Knopfler, "Knopfler picks up the National and demonstrates how he hit on the famous arpeggio lines in "Romeo and Juliet", from the Making Movies album, while experimenting with an open G tuning." The instrumentation remains simple during the verses and moves to a full-on rock arrangement in the chorus sections.

The song itself, written by Knopfler, was inspired by his failed romance with Holly Vincent, lead singer of the short-lived band Holly and the Italians. The song speaks of a Romeo who is still very much in love with his Juliet, but she now treats him like "just another one of [her] deals". Knopfler has both stated and implied that he believes Vincent was using him to boost her career. The song's line, "Now you just say, oh Romeo, yeah, you know I used to have a scene with him," refers to an interview with Vincent, where she says "What happened was that I had a scene with Mark Knopfler and it got to the point where he couldn't handle it and we split up."

Reception
Record World called it a "compelling performance that's both beautiful and forceful," praising Knopfler's guitar playing and the "Dylanesque" vocals.  Ultimate Classic Rock critic Michael Gallucci rated "Romeo and Juliet" as Dire Straits' 3rd best song, saying that it "bridges Shakespeare, West Side Story and a modern rock 'n' roll love story where fame, not family, is keeping the young lovers apart."  Classic Rock critic Paul Rees rated it to be Dire Straits' 4th greatest song, saying that most of it is "spine-tingling" and praising the "heart-tugging" refrain.

Charts

Certifications

Personnel
Mark Knopfler – National Style O resonator guitar, lead guitar, lead vocals, rhythm guitar
John Illsley – bass guitar
Pick Withers – drums, percussion

Additional personnel

Roy Bittan – piano, Hammond organ

Covers

Indigo Girls: a solo rendition by Amy Ray on the duo's album Rites of Passage.
The Killers in 2007: it was recorded live at Abbey Road Studios for the Channel 4 show Live from Abbey Road, featured as a B-side on "For Reasons Unknown" and reappeared on their compilation album Sawdust. "It's a great song," said drummer Ronnie Vannucci Jr. "Brandon (Flowers) was really into it. The original idea was to do the song with Johnny Borrell but he got really sick and couldn't do it. I think we pulled it off pretty good." Added Flowers: "It's one of the finest songs ever. Brilliant melodies."
British folk singer-songwriter Steve Knightley: on his 2007 album Cruel River.

References

1980s ballads
1980 songs
1981 singles
Dire Straits songs
Rock ballads
Songs written by Mark Knopfler
Works based on Romeo and Juliet
Song recordings produced by Mark Knopfler
Song recordings produced by Jimmy Iovine
Vertigo Records singles